The 2014–15 Yale Bulldogs men's basketball team represented Yale University during the 2014–15 NCAA Division I men's basketball season. The Bulldogs, led by 16th year head coach James Jones, played their home games at John J. Lee Amphitheater of the Payne Whitney Gymnasium and were members of the Ivy League. The Bulldogs lost their One-game playoff against Harvard 53-51. Despite having posted an 11-3 Ivy League record and a 22-10 overall record the Bulldogs weren't invited to a postseason tournament.

Previous season
The Bulldogs finished the season 19–14, 9–5 in Ivy League play to finish in second place. They were invited to the CollegeInsider.com Tournament where they defeated Quinnipiac, Holy Cross, Columbia and VMI to advance to the CIT championship game where they lost to Murray State.

Departures

Roster

Schedule

|-
!colspan=9 style="background:#00449E; color:#FFFFFF;"| Regular season

|-
!colspan=9 style="background:#00449E; color:#FFFFFF;"| Ivy League one game playoff

Source:

References

Yale Bulldogs men's basketball seasons
Yale
Yale Bulldogs
Yale Bulldogs